Hunting Lodge or Hunting lodge may refer to:

 Hunting lodge (U.K.), in Britain, a small country property used for organising hunting parties
 Jagdschloss ("hunting lodge"), in central Europe, a mansion or schloss built as the hunting residence for a king or nobleman and his entourage
 Pavillon de chasse ("hunting pavilion"), in France, a building dedicated to venery built in areas where hunts take place regularly
 Hunting cabin, a cottage used for hunting
 Hunting Lodge, Rouse Hill, heritage-lister property in New South Wales, Australia
 Hunting Lodge Farm, historic house in Ohio, United States

See also 
 Hunting Lodge Mass Grave